miHoYo Co., Ltd. is a Chinese video game development and publishing company. In addition to games, the company has created various products such as animated series, novels, comics, music, and merchandise.

The company is the creator of Genshin Impact, an open-world action role-playing game released in 2020, which is one of the highest grossing mobile games. miHoYo also developed the game Honkai Impact 3rd.

Aiming to expand its content production, technology research, and publications outside China, in February 2022, miHoYo launched the brand HoYoverse under its subsidiary Cognosphere Pte., Ltd. based in Jurong East, Singapore. Since then, miHoYo has been doing business globally under the brand and has operations in Montreal, Los Angeles, Tokyo, and Seoul. 

miHoYo also operates under the subsidiaries Shanghai miHoYo Yingtie Technology Co., Ltd. and Shanghai miHoYo Tianming Technology Co., Ltd.. The former is the publisher of Genshin Impact, Honkai: Star Rail, and Zenless Zone Zero; the latter is the developer of Tears of Themis.

Etymology
The letters "H" and "Y" in miHoYo's name come from the names of Cai Haoyu and Luo Yuhao, and the letter "O" was added based on the fact that names of famous companies such as Facebook, Google and Microsoft contain that letter. Due to "HoYo" already being registered, "mi" from the VOCALOID software Hatsune Miku was prepended to the name. Hatsune Miku was picked because of her popularity among otakus.

History

Foundation
miHoYo began with three computer science students from Shanghai Jiao Tong University who shared an interest in technology and ACG (anime, comics, and games) culture: Cai "Hugh" Haoyu, Liu "Forrest" Wei, and Luo Yuhao. Before establishing the miHoYo name, the three have worked on projects together. Their first project was an open-source literature community which won them scholarships worth CNY 200,000 at a competition.

In 2010, the team developed an isometric tile-based game engine called the "Misato Engine" or "Misato2D" using Adobe Flash Player. Katsuragi Misato, a character from the Japanese franchise Neon Genesis Evangelion, inspired the name. Using an upgraded version of the engine, they developed a game called Legend of Saha for a Flash game development competition held during the second China Game Developers Conference (CGDC) in July of that year. The team won a cash prize of CNY 30,000 provided by Shanda Games. Shanda Games later outsourced them to develop a mini-game called Bubble Hero.

Studio business
In January 2011, the three students set up the miHoYo studio in the D32 university dormitory at their campus. Later that year, Liu Wei, representing the group, participated in the New Entrepreneur Talents competition and won third place. miHoYo was awarded a 50-square-meter office, located at No. 100 Qinzhou Road, with a term of six months and a CNY 100,000 interest-free loan from the Eaglet Program of the Shanghai Technology Entrepreneurship Foundation for Graduates.  They moved from the dormitory to the office in December. Each person had a desk against the wall, and a large table filled with comics and light novels sat at the center of the room.

No one had artistic ability, so Zhang Qinghua, also known as CiCi, got contacted on Tencent social media. At that time, Zhang was an undergraduate student at the Guangdong University of Technology, School of Art and Design, Department of Animation. He was in the second half of his senior year when he met miHoYo's founders at his internship. The first character he was commissioned to design was Kiana Kaslana, the main character of FlyMe2theMoon. As the only artist on the team, he created every artwork for their early titles. Zhang recounted his experience of working at the team's dormitory:

FlyMe2theMoon
miHoYo launched FlyMe2theMoon on 28 September 2011, on the App Store as an independent developer. Fly Me to the Moon, the ending theme song of the Neon Genesis Evangelion anime series, served as the basis of the game's concept. It inspired the team to create a puzzle game about a "magical girl flying [to] the moon." The game was developed using the Cocos2D software and the Box2D physics engine. The game's song titled "Moon Trip" was composed by VOCALOID music producer Yu Jianliu and Lemonjolly wrote the lyrics. Yu used the Hatsune Miku voicebank for the song.

FlyMe2theMoon received little financial success, and the three founders only had a monthly income of CNY 4,000. In search of an investor, Wei Liu represented the team in various university startup contests. The non-mainstream status of anime and gaming culture in China posed a challenge, and that their group was only composed of university graduates also made it difficult. After being turned down in these contests, they eventually got an angel investment of CNY 1,000,000 from Hangzhou Skye Network Technology Co., Ltd.. It was miHoYo's only outside funding.

Company founding and Houkai Gakuen
On 13 February 2012, Shanghai miHoYo Network Technology Co., Ltd. was officially established. Jin Zhicheng, a member of the FlyMe2theMoon development team, left in March to take up a job offer at Cisco Systems (China) Research & Development Co., Ltd.. He transferred his equities to Liu Wei and Luo Yuhao. During that time, Jin did a small amount of program development work and did not participate in company management. Qinghua Zhang first worked as an artist at 4399 Network Co., Ltd. before he joined miHoYo Co., Ltd. in February 2012 as an art director and a supervisor. Cai Haoyu legally represents the company and serves as its chairman and general manager; he is also the controlling shareholder and the actual controller. Liu Wei and Luo Yuhao serve as directors. Cai is largest shareholder of miHoYo as he controls 41% of its shares; Liu and Luo control 22.6% and 21.4%, respectively. Hangzhou Miyi Investment Co., Ltd. has the remaining 15% of the shares.

Moving on from FlyMe2theMoon, the team envisioned a more successful game. Inspired by the side-scrolling shooter game Zombie Town and their shared interest in the Japanese anime-manga series Highschool of the Dead, they created their first game since the company's founding, Houkai Gakuen, also known as Zombiegal Kawaii. The project began in December 2011, and it took the team three months to create four or five demos for the game. The game was developed with the Unity engine (versions 3.2 to 3.5) and the Autodesk Maya computer graphics software. Within the next eight months, they expanded the gameplay with adjusted values and added systems. The game's first version came in November 2012, and the first public testing was in December.

Houkai Gakuen 2

Houkai Gakuen 2 or Guns Girl Z, a pick-up-and-play arcade action game, was launched in June 2013. Later in August, the team began working on server architecture design and generation. The work on the peripheral system and game graphics came in November. Compared to Houkai Gakuen, the development time of Houkai Gakuen 2 was shorter because it used the underlying data, art assets, and core gameplay of the previous game, thus shortening the research and development needed. The core gameplay was further developed by copying and then converting the system of the game Puzzle and Dragons into an action game, a process that took three months. The content taken from Houkai Gakuen got expanded with the addition of new characters, weapons, and clothing sets. The testing came on 26 January 2014, and the game was released in March on the Bilibili platform.

Though the game had some financial success, it had many technical problems such as top-up failure and server downtime. For a team only composed of seven people, this was hard. Later, the company ended up employing its players as staff. Within the same year, the Honkai Impact 3rd project began at the same time the company envisioned creating the "Honkai universe."

Honkai Impact 3rd

The Honkai Impact 3rd project began in June 2014. On 6 July, Cai Haoyu attended the GameLook Game Open Day conference in Shanghai, where he made a speech on the development and promotion of Houkai Gakuen 2. In the speech, he mentioned that the team was working on the third version of Houkai Gakuen and that its core gameplay was in progress.

In March 2015, miHoYo started developing its engines for the game. They created a physics-based animation system; it can simulate the performance of various bodies based on physical formulas, showing more realistic character movements and destructive scene effects. It can also correct abrupt transitions between animations, making the animations smoother and more natural. In addition, miHoYo developed its technologies for 3D modeling, light mapping, and real-time and pre-rendering systems. Content production for the game began in October 2015. Creative influences on the combat gameplay were the game series Bayonetta and Devil May Cry. The development team also studied games like Guilty Gear Xrd that used 3D cel-shading. Since no member on the team knew how to do 3D projects, transitioning from 2D to 3D was a challenge. Creating the artwork, model, and animation of Kiana Kaslana took six months. After a test run, the team discarded the work and restarted from scratch to establish the current system.

Honkai Impact 3rd had its internal iOS beta in March 2016, launched in September, publicly tested, and then released in October. Recurring characters such as Kiana Kaslana, Raiden Mei, and Bronya Zaychik appear in a story different from previous games. Its gameplay involves role play and hack-and-slash action and also features gacha mechanics. In addition to the game, it was followed by multiple supplementary media such as an anime series, graphic novels, comics, and promotional videos. Though miHoYo's early titles were successful within Asia, the company did not reach global success until the release of Honkai Impact 3rd. Months after its release in Mainland China, the following servers opened: 22 February 2017, for Japan; 18 May 2017, for Taiwan; 17 October 2017, for South Korea; 1 November 2017, for Southeast Asia; 28 March 2018, for North America and Europe. After being a mobile-exclusive game, Honkai Impact 3rd was made available for PC on 26 December 2019.

Company growth and risks
Within two years after the release of Honkai Impact 3rd, the seven-person company grew to include around 200 employees. Over 100 were involved in research and development. The average age of these employees was 29 years old; people under the age of thirty accounted for 84% of the company's employees. Four years later, the employee count grew to over 1,000.

On 15 February 2017, miHoYo filed for an initial public offering (IPO) to the China Securities Regulatory Commission when the company was planning to raise over a billion Yuan. During the process, several concerns were under attention, including the company's dependence on a single intellectual property, the Honkai series. The main source of miHoYo's revenue was Houkai Gakuen 2, accounting for 96.34%. The risk is that the company may not be able to continue to launch new products to meet the needs of players or update the content of their games, and they could face the loss of users. Another issue is that the company might fail to grasp changes in preferences, and the Honkai series loses appeal. On 19 December, miHoYo submitted an updated prospectus that included Honkai Impact 3 in its revenue, accounting for 98.82% with Houkai Gakuen 2. Due to unknown reasons, miHoYo withdrew its IPO application in 2020.

Official gamer forums
In November 2018, miHoYo launched its official gamer community Miyoushe, also known as miHoYo BBS. While used to disseminate official game information and event peripherals, it also features practical tools for players, such as calculators and character-building simulations. It also serves as a content creation platform for players. miHoYo Forums, the global counterpart of miHoYo BBS, launched on 16 January 2020. It was announced as the official forum for Genshin Impact. Later, it got a new brand, "HoYoLAB." The HoYoLAB app had its closed beta testing starting on 1 June 2021, and launched on 15 July. In the Chinese forums, the mascot Miyouji was revealed on 30 April 2020. Miyouji has different themed costumes following miHoYo's games, such as Houkai Gakuen 2, Honkai Impact 3rd, Tears of Themis, and Genshin Impact. Alongside Miyouji is the rabbit that appears in the forum's logo. HoYoLAB's mascot is Mimo, who also appears as the logo.

Genshin Impact

Genshin Impact began its development in January 2017 with the working title "" ("Honkai 4"). At that time, producer Cai Haoyu considered creating a new project to enhance miHoYo's core research and development capabilities and present products with significant quality improvement to players in the future. The idea of creating an open-world game came out of that. During the next seven months, the team tried several prototypes. After Cai played Nintendo's The Legend of Zelda: Breath of the Wild, the team took inspiration from the game's world exploration experience. Other inspirations came from the random events of Grand Theft Auto, the strategy in Divinity: Original Sin, and game developer Naughty Dog.

The production team initially had 150 people. They underestimated the difficulty of creating an open world, so it grew to 300 people by mid-2019, then 500 by April 2020, and then 700 by February 2021. The research and development cost of the project began with 25 million USD and then exceeded 100 million, which was recouped two weeks after the game's release. Much of the game's budget was invested in music production. Yu-Peng Chen, also known as Chen Zhiyi, joined the project as a music producer and composed the scores for the Mondstadt and Liyue regions. Zhang Qinghua served as the senior art director.

Genshin Impact had its first beta testing in June 2019, focused on core gameplay mechanisms and the Mondstadt region. In early 2020, the overseas promotion of the game was affected by the COVID-19 pandemic. Development also got delayed by a month as working from home was almost impossible, and employees could not access office equipment. The second beta testing came in March and featured Liyue, and then the third beta testing came in July. The game was released on 28 September 2020.

Software products

Company activities

Cultural promotion
In September 2020, miHoYo established strategic cooperation with Zhangjiajie to promote cultural tourism in the city with the help of Genshin Impact. The topography of Zhangjiajie's karst landscapes inspired the level designs of Jueyun Karst and Mt. Tianheng. After the agreement, two life-size Teleport Waypoints were installed at the Zhangjiajie National Forest Park and Huangshi Village. Next, miHoYo cooperated with Huanglong for ecological environment protection. Huanglong's multicolored pools served as the inspiration for the level design of Luhua Pool.

Charity and aid
In November 2020, miHoYo and the China Social Welfare Foundation jointly launched the Yiqi Shouhu charity program. During the event, all profits from Tears of Themis charity gift packs were donated to the foundation as relief for children with autism.

On 12 July 2021, the Xinhuo Charity Program was jointly launched by the China Youth Development Foundation and Shanghai miHoYo Network Technology Co., Ltd. The project is committed to paying attention to and supporting the development of youth education. The first phase involved Tongzi Primary School in Yunnan Province, which got support from various aspects such as hardware conditions, educational facilities, teacher training, etc. The project also aims to provide school uniforms for all students and launch a teacher training program for seventeen primary schools in Yanjin County.

On 23 July 2021, miHoYo delivered disaster relief supplies to Xinmi County in Henan Province. Henan Province experienced flooding due to heavy rainfall, affecting hundreds of people.

In February 2022, Shanghai experienced a COVID-19 outbreak that led to a city-wide lockdown until June. In March, miHoYo responded to the critical stage of the epidemic control by purchasing batches of supplies and donating them to the Caohejing and Hongmei communities in Xuhui District. In April, the second batch of supplies included 10,000 sets of protective equipment, 10,000 bottles of hand sanitizer gel, 40,000 N95 masks, and 100,000 pieces of disinfection wipes. miHoYo also donated pillows and peripheral products for children at a makeshift hospital at Shilong Road. In response to employees' needs, the company distributed food packages and epidemic prevention supplies to employees affected by the lockdown. The packages included fruits, vegetables, and disinfection and protection materials. Also provided were mental health counseling services.

On 15 August 2022, miHoYo released a video about the second phase of the Xinhuo Charity Program, which showed the completed construction of Tongzi Primary School's new building from the first phase. Students can study in the multimedia classrooms of the building with upgraded hardware. Furthermore, new street lamps were installed on the campus for the safety of the students at night. The second phase also included the construction of a waterway, flush toilet, bathroom, and solar-powered water stations for the student and staff dormitory in Bazha Village Central Primary School in Qinghai Province. The construction expects completion in the second half of 2022.

In November 2022, miHoYo collaborated with the Taofen Foundation to jointly launch the Yuejian Weiming charity project. More than 37,000 books worth 2 million Yuan were donated to a number of primary schools in Dali Bai Autonomous Prefecture and Lancang Lahu Autonomous County of Yunnan Province. Aside from books, postcards written by Tears of Themis players were also given to students.

Investments
On 4 March 2021, miHoYo signed an agreement of strategic cooperation with Ruijin Hospital to build the miHoYo Joint Laboratory of Encephalopathy Center of Ruijin Hospital, also called the Ruijin-miHoYo Laboratory. The two parties will combine their respective advantages in medical research and information technology to jointly develop brain-computer interface technology research. Lü Baoliang, a professor from the Department of Computer Science and Engineering of Shanghai Jiao Tong University, heads the laboratory; he was also the supervisor of miHoYo co-founder Cai Haoyu's master's thesis. The laboratory began with the research project "Clinical Research on Brain-Computer Interface Neuromodulation and Treatment of Refractory Depression."

In early 2022, miHoYo and NIO Capital led the first funding round for Energy Singularity, raising nearly CNY 400 million. Energy Singularity was established in 2021 in Shanghai, China. The company focuses on the research and development of HTS (High-Temperature Superconductor) magnets, plasma physics, and artificial intelligence technologies to commercialize fusion energy. Using the funded capital, the company will develop an experimental tokamak device planned to be operational by 2024.

On 20 May 2022, miHoYo participated in a funding round for Oriental Space Technology (Shandong) Co., Ltd., which raised CNY 400 million. The company focuses on aerospace technology and will develop a launch vehicle and a reusable liquid oxygen and kerosene rocket engine using the raised funds. The plan is for the rocket to launch in mid-2023.

Committees
In May 2021, miHoYo established the Communist Youth League Committee under Shanghai miHoYo Network Technology Co., Ltd. The committee aims to integrate youth into company development and partake in the innovation and publicization of traditional Chinese culture. The committee created comics and travel maps with the help of Genshin Impact material to promote Xuhui District cultural tourism landmarks. The character Paimon was formally named "Xuhui Youth Culture Star Promoter."

In September 2021, Shanghai miHoYo Network Technology Co., Ltd. got promoted from a party branch to a party committee under the Chinese Communist Party (CCP). The committee has five members, including Liu Wei as the committee secretary and miHoYo vice president Yin Chunbo.

On 8 July 2022, Shanghai miHoYo Network Technology Co., Ltd. had its first trade union congress. miHoYo vice president Yin Chunbo was elected as the chairman of the first session of miHoYo's trade union committee. The meeting stated miHoYo's establishment of a trade union not only helps safeguard the legitimate rights and interests of employees, promotes the high-quality development of enterprises and industries, but also serves the economic development of trade union organizations.

Rankings and certification
In August 2021, miHoYo Technology (Shanghai) Co., Ltd. was selected as a "Key National Cultural Export Enterprise" along with Genshin Impact as a "Key National Cultural Export Project" for the 2021-2022 period. Previously, the company and Honkai Impact 3rd was selected for those titles in 2019. The annual List of National Cultural Export Key Enterprises and Key Projects is organized by the offices of the Ministry of Commerce, Ministry of Finance, Ministry of Culture and Tourism, and the Central Propaganda Department.

In August 2022, miHoYo obtained information security certifications for ISO/IEC 27001 and ISO/IEC 27701 issued by the British Standards Institution (BSI). According to miHoYo's official announcement published in October 2022, the company had "undergone a comprehensive assessment, including strict on-site audits."

On 26 November 2021, the Internet Society of China released the China Internet Enterprise Comprehensive Strength Index for 2021. miHoYo was listed as one of "China's Top 100 Internet Enterprises with Comprehensive Strength"; miHoYo ranked 23rd on the list, 1st among Shanghai game companies, and 3rd among Shanghai internet companies. It was also the fifth consecutive time miHoYo was included in the list.

On 24 November 2022, the Shanghai Cultural and Creative Industry Promotion Association and Shanghai First Financial Media Co., Ltd.—under the guidance of the Shanghai Municipal Committee Propaganda Department—announced Shanghai miHoYo Yingtie Technology Co., Ltd. as one of the Top Ten Cultural Enterprises, company co-founder Liu Wei as one of the Top Ten People of the Year, and Genshin Impact as one of the Top Ten Cultural Brands of Shanghai.

On 28 December 2022, Guangming Daily and Economic Daily jointly announced the "Top 30 National Cultural Enterprises" with Shanghai Mihayou Network Technology Co., Ltd. included in the list. miHoYo was praised by Guangming Daily as "a representative scientific and technological innovation enterprise driven by Shanghai's innovation and entrepreneurship policies."

In February 2023, during the 2022 China Game Industry Annual Conference, hosted by the China Audio-Video and Digital Publishing Association and sponsored by the National Press and Publication Administration (NPPA), announced miHoYo as a recipient of two awards. The company was selected as one of the Top Ten "Going Global" Game Enterprises, and the game Genshin Impact as one of the Top Ten Outstanding Mobile Games. miHoYo and Genshin Impact were also nominated for several other awards.

Subsidiary companies

Notes

References

External links
 
 
  on Bilibili
  on Sina Weibo
 MiHoYo on Facebook (active 2011-2021)
 miHoYo on Twitter (active only in 2011)
  on Twitter (Japanese)
 miHoYoGames on Weixin
 miHoYoHR on Weixin
 lyh62771 on YouTube (active 2011-2014)

Chinese companies established in 2012
Companies based in Shanghai
Video game companies established in 2012
Video game companies of China
Video game development companies
Video game publishers
MiHoYo